Duddilla Sripada Rao was an Indian politician and was a member of the Andhra Pradesh Legislative Assembly representing the Indian National Congress.

References

Telugu politicians
Indian National Congress politicians from Andhra Pradesh
Speakers of the Andhra Pradesh Legislative Assembly
Living people
1935 births